Albert James Bartlett (23 April 1900 – 6 October 1968) was an Australian cricketer. He played one first-class match for South Australia in 1925/26.

See also
 List of South Australian representative cricketers

References

External links
 

1900 births
1968 deaths
Australian cricketers
South Australia cricketers
Cricketers from Adelaide